Major-General Sir Sebastian John Lechmere Roberts,  (7 January 1954 – 9 March 2023) was a senior British Army officer who latterly served as the Senior Army Representative at the Royal College of Defence Studies.

Military career
Educated at Ampleforth College and Balliol College, Oxford, Roberts was commissioned into the Irish Guards in 1977.

Roberts went on to be Commanding Officer of the 1st Battalion of the Irish Guards in London and Northern Ireland. He was appointed Major-General commanding the Household Division and General Officer Commanding London District in 2003. He became the Senior Army Representative at the Royal College of Defence Studies in 2007 and retired in 2010.

Roberts also served as Colonel of the Irish Guards from 2008 to 2011, being succeeded by the Prince of Wales, then Prince William of Wales, on 10 February 2011.

Roberts was the author of Soldiering: The Military Covenant (1998).

Personal life and death
Roberts was married to Elizabeth. He died on 9 March 2023, at the age of 69. He was survived by four children.

References

 

1954 births
2023 deaths
English Roman Catholics
British Army major generals
People educated at Ampleforth College
Alumni of Balliol College, Oxford
Knights Commander of the Royal Victorian Order
Officers of the Order of the British Empire
Irish Guards officers